The Tale of Despereaux is a 2003 children's fantasy book written by Kate DiCamillo. The main plot follows the adventures of a mouse named Despereaux Tilling, as he sets out on his quest to rescue a beautiful human princess from the rats. The book won the 2004 Newbery Medal award and has been adapted into a film, a video game, and a stage musical.

Accolades
In 2007 the U.S. National Education Association listed the book as one of its "Teachers' Top 100 Books for Children", based on an online poll. Teachers also made it a summer reading project. In 2012 it was ranked number 51 among all-time children's novels in a survey published by School Library Journal—the second of three books by DiCamillo in the Top 100.

Plot
A noble mouse named Despereaux saves a princess named Princess Pea.

Book I: A Mouse Is Born
A small, sickly mouse named Despereaux Tilling is born in a castle with his eyes open (most mice are born blind). Despereaux, unlike other mice, spends much time reading, and particularly enjoys a book about a knight saving a princess and living happily ever after. One day while reading, he hears music that sounds like honey. He follows the sound, which leads him to Princess Pea and King Philip. He sits at the king's feet to hear the music, falls in love with the princess, and speaks to her. The king leads the mouse away because mice are related to rats, who were outlawed some years ago. Furlough Tilling, Despereaux's brother, sees this, and tells his father, Lester. Lester calls the mouse council as Furlough goes to collect Despereaux. The mouse council orders Despereaux to be sent to the dungeon to die, because talking to a human is forbidden. When Despereaux goes into the dungeon, he meets Gregory, the jailer, who saves him because Despereaux tells him a nice story.

Book II: Chiaroscuro
Book II centers around a rat named Roscuro who loved the light and was less vicious and cunning than the other rats. After he took a red table cloth from a prisoner who confessed that he traded his own daughter for it and didn't look back at her when he left her, Roscuro decided to go into the light; against the wishes of his friend, Botticelli Remorso. He climbed onto a chandelier, above a banquet. However, he fell into the queen's soup, and the queen, whose habit was to state the obvious, said "there's a rat in my soup" before dying. The princess, now hostile to Roscuro, ordered him to leave. Roscuro, angry, desired revenge against the princess. The king, upset by the death of his wife, banned the use of spoons, soup, bowls, and rats.

Book III: The Tale of Miggery Sow
Many years before Despereaux and Roscuro were born, a six-year-old girl named Miggery "Mig" Sow witnesses the death of her ill mother. Afterward, Mig is sold to work by her father for some cigarettes, a hen, and a red tablecloth to a man Mig calls Uncle. Uncle often clouts Mig's ears, leaving her partially deaf. Mig decides, upon seeing the princess pass by on a horse, that she wants to be a princess. Mig is then sent to work in the castle by the King's soldiers, who tell "Uncle" that no human being is allowed to own another. In the castle, she gains a lot of weight. with only her head staying small. Mig's main job is to go down to the dungeons to deliver Gregory the jailer his meal and, while there, she meets Roscuro and confesses to him that her greatest wish is to become a princess. Gregory gives her a handkerchief, Despereaux in it, and returns to the castle. Roscuro convinces Mig that if she helps him kidnap Princess Pea, he'll make her a servant girl so Miggery Sow can become a princess.

Book IV: Recalled to the Light
Despereaux escapes the dungeons on a tray of Gregory's that Mig brings back to the kitchen, where he hears her conversation with Roscuro. However, Despereaux is soon discovered by Mig and Cook. Cook, as a mouse-hating woman, orders Mig to kill Despereaux. She explains to Mig that her philosophy with mice is "kill 'em, even if they're already dead". When Despereaux is attempting to flee, Mig chops off his tail with a knife so that she can tell Cook that she got a part of the "mercy". Despereaux spends the night in pain, sleeping on a sack of flour. He dreams of the castle's knights in shining armor, darkness, and light. However, when the knight removes their helmet, the shining armor is empty. Despereaux begins to doubt "happily ever after" and everything he has read and starts to weep. Meanwhile, Roscuro leads Mig to Princess Pea's room with a knife in one hand and a candle in the other to lead Princess Pea to the dungeon.

The next morning, the castle is in a panic over the missing princess. Guards are sent to search the dungeon, only to find Gregory dead from terror. He was lost in the dark mazes because Roscuro had chewed the rope which secures him to the dungeon entrance. Despereaux is seen by the mouse council, who mistook him for a ghost because he is covered in flour from sleeping on a flour sack. Despereaux forgives his father, upon the father's request, for sentencing him to the dungeon, before mocking the rest of the council. Despereaux goes on to see the King. Despereaux tells the King that he knows that Pea is in the dungeon, but the King refuses to believe him because Despereaux is related distantly to the rats.

Despereaux then goes to Hovis, the thread master. Hovis gives him an entire spool of red thread and a sewing needle to serve as a sword for his quest to the dungeons. On his way, he runs into Cook, who has grown so anxious from Pea's disappearance she has resorted to breaking the law and making soup. Instead of attacking Despereaux, she offers him some soup before seeing him off. Arriving at the dungeon, Despereaux loses the spool of thread when it leaves him at the top of the stairs. The spool of thread rolls to Botticelli Remorso, who smells soup, tears, flour, oil, and the blood of a mouse. Botticelli waits for Despereaux at the bottom of the dungeon stairs and when the small mouse arrives, Botticelli tricks Despereaux into thinking that he wants to help him save Princess Pea by leading him directly to her. Despereaux, knowing that there is nothing else he could do, trusts Botticelli Remorso and follows the rat to the princess. Other rats start following as well when they smell Despereaux and the soup he recently ate. Mig, meanwhile, learns that Roscuro tricked her into helping him kidnap Pea and that she will never be a princess. Roscuro plans for Pea to remain locked in the dungeons so that he can marvel over her brightly colored dress, but Despereaux arrives to save Pea, and Mig chops Roscuro's tail off with the knife to save the mouse after Roscuro blocked Despereaux's way. Despereaux threatens to kill Roscuro with the sewing needle, which causes Botticelli to howl with amused laughter at the thought of a mouse killing a rat. Roscuro, catching a whiff of the soup left on Despereaux's whiskers, realizes he does not truly want to hurt anyone and begins crying. Pea offers that if Roscuro lets her go, she will treat him with some soup. Roscuro agrees. Botticelli is so disgusted by the happiness of all that is happening that he returns to the darkness with the other rats.

Despereaux and Pea become close friends. Roscuro is allowed access into the upstairs of the castle, and reunites Mig's father, a prisoner in the dungeons, with his daughter. Mig's father promises that he loves Mig and will never leave her. But before this, Roscuro, Mig, the King, Pea, and Despereaux all get together for soup, as Despereaux's friend Hovis, his parents, and his brother watch in amazement behind the scenes.

Adaptations

Film

In 2008, the book was adapted as an animated film  of the same name.

Video game 

On December 2, 2008, a video game for the Nintendo DS, Wii, and PlayStation 2 of the same name based on the film was released. On December 16, 2008, the game was also released for PC.

Stage musical
In 2018, the book was adapted into a musical by the PigPen Theatre Co.

References

Sources
Griswold, Jerry, "'The Tale of Despereaux': A World Without sad Soup", The New York Times, 16 November 2003

External links

2003 American novels
2003 children's books
2003 fantasy novels
American children's novels
Children's fantasy novels
Newbery Medal–winning works
American fantasy novels adapted into films
Children's books adapted into films
Novels adapted into video games
English-language novels
Books about mice and rats
Talking animals in fiction
Works about princesses
Novels about royalty
Novels about friendship
Novels set in France
Works set in castles
Novels set on islands
Candlewick Press books